Utricularia cochleata is a small, bryophyllous, lithophytic carnivorous plant that belongs to the genus Utricularia. It is endemic to Brazil and is only known from the type location in Goiás. It grows as a terrestrial lithophyte on mossy rocks within range of the spray of a waterfall. The species epithet cochleata refers to the shell-like shape of the recurved corolla. U. cochleata was first collected in 2004 and formally described by Claudia Petean Bove in 2008.

See also 
 List of Utricularia species

References 

Carnivorous plants of South America
Flora of Brazil
Plants described in 2008
cochleata